RTV Studio B, more often called Studio B, is a radio and television broadcaster in Belgrade, Serbia. It was the first broadcast station outside the national electronic media system.

Background
RTV Studio B broadcasts in a radius of 100 km around Belgrade, covering an area in which there are three million viewers. One notable program was "Good Morning, Belgrade", which was launched in 1975.

History
Studio B was launched as a radio station in 1970 by the journalists from the Borba group. In 1972, it became a corporation owned by Belgrade's Municipal Council. From 1975, Duško Radović was the editor of Studio B.

Studio B became independent in April 1991, but this was reversed by a decision of the corporate court on 15 February 1996, when the last serving director of NTV Studio B, Milorad Roganović was removed from his duty, and from that day on, Studio B has served as a government-owned company. In October 1997, Zoran Ostojić was removed from the post of director and Lila Radonjić from the post of editor-in-chief of Studio B, and this was opposed by a demonstration.

In May 2000, Studio B was again taken over. On 3 December 2012, the News programme of Studio B and some other programmes have dropped the Latin script in favour of Cyrillic script.

On 19 August 2015, Studio B was sold to the Serbian media company "Maxim Media" for 530,000 euros.

Programmes

Telenovelas / Series

See also

 Media in Serbia

References

External links

Mass media companies of Serbia
Television stations in Serbia
Radio stations in Serbia
1970 establishments in Serbia
Mass media in Belgrade
Companies based in Belgrade
Mass media companies established in 1970